Herman Krefting (25 September 1592 – 9 February 1651) was a German born, Norwegian ironworks pioneer.

Krefting was born in Bremen; the son of Wolter Krefting and his wife Anna Winckel. He co-founded Det Norske Jernkompani in Copenhagen in 1618. 
From 1624 he was running several ironworks in Norway, including Bærums Verk and Eidsvoll Verk as well as  Hakadals Verk at Hadeland and Fossum Verk 
at Gjerpen. He died in Øvre Eiker in 1651 and was buried at Haug Church.

References

1592 births
1651 deaths
Businesspeople from Bremen
Norwegian businesspeople in mining
Norwegian company founders
Emigrants from the Holy Roman Empire to Denmark-Norway
17th-century Norwegian businesspeople